

James Stokoe (born September 4, 1985) is a Canadian comic book artist who is known for his work on such titles as Wonton Soup, Orc Stain and Godzilla: The Half-Century War.
Along with Corey Lewis, Brandon Graham and Marley Zarcone, he's a part of a studio/collective called "Yosh Comics".

Bibliography

Early work
Otakorp:
Otazine #1: "Smokedown" (w/a, anthology, 2005)
Snack Comix #1: "Krill or be Krilled" (w/a, 2006)
Rival Schools #1-4 (backgrounds, w/a: Corey Lewis and Erik Ko, UDON, 2006)
Wonton Soup: Big Bowl Edition (w/a, tpb, 392 pages, Oni Press, 2014, ISBN 978-1620101667) collects:
Volume 1 (tpb, 200 pages, Oni Press, 2007)
Volume 2 (tpb, 184 pages, Oni Press, 2009)

Image Comics
24Seven Volume 1: "Fire Breathing City" (a, with Brandon Graham, anthology graphic novel, 224 pages, 2006)
Popgun Volume 1: "Express Elevator to Hell Tour" (w/a, anthology graphic novel, 455 pages, 2007)
Comic Book Tattoo: "Mr. Zebra" (a, with Rantz Hoseley, anthology graphic novel, 480 pages, 2008)
Orc Stain (w/a, 2010–2012) collected as:
Volume 1 (collects #1-5, tpb, 168 pages, 2010)
 Issues 6-7 remain uncollected.
Tokyopop Presents: King City #7: "Power Plant" (w/a, co-feature, 2010) collected in King City (tpb, 424 pages, 2012)
Prophet #39: "Diehard" (a, with Brandon Graham, among other artists, Extreme Studios, 2013) collected in Volume 4: Joining (tpb, 168 pages, 2015)

Marvel Comics
Marvel Knights: Strange Tales II #3: "Silver Surfer" (w/a, anthology, 2011) collected in Strange Tales II (hc, 144 pages, 2011, ; tpb, 2011)
100th Anniversary Special: The Avengers (w/a, one-shot, 2014) collected in Marvel: The 100th Anniversary (tpb, 112 pages, 2014)
Secret Wars:
Siege #1 (of 4) (a, with Kieron Gillen, among other artists, 2015) collected in Secret Wars — Battleworld: Siege (tpb, 144 pages, 2016)
Battleworld #4: "Silver Surfer vs. Galactus" (w/a, anthology, 2015) collected in Secret Wars Journal & Battleworld (tpb, 248 pages, 2016)
Moon Knight vol. 6 (a, with Jeff Lemire, Greg Smallwood, Wilfredo Torres and Francesco Francavilla, 2016–2017) collected in:
Lunatic (includes #5, tpb, 120 pages, 2016)
Reincarnations (collects #6-9, tpb, 112 pages, 2016)
Edge of Venomverse #5 (a, with Clay McLeod Chapman, 2017) collected in Edge of Venomverse (tpb, 112 pages, 2018)
Venom vol. 4 Annual #1: "Unstoppable" (w/a, 2018)
Captain Marvel vol. 10 #8: "Everyone is a Target, Part Eight" (a, with Clay McLeod Chapman, co-feature, 2019)
Marvel Monsters (a, with Cullen Bunn, Scott Hepburn and various artists, one-shot, 2019)

Other publishers
Godzilla (IDW Publishing):
The Half-Century War #1-5 (w/a, 2012–2013) collected as Godzilla: The Half-Century War (tpb, 124 pages, 2013, ; hc, 152 pages, 2015)
Godzilla in Hell #1 (of 5) (w/a, anthology, 2015) collected in Godzilla in Hell (tpb, 120 pages, 2016)
Sullivan's Sluggers (a, with Mark Andrew Smith, graphic novel, 200 pages, Kickstarter, 2012)
Think of a City page 45 (a, with Steve Orlando, Internet art project, 2015)
Aliens: Dead Orbit #1-4 (w/a, Dark Horse, 2017) collected as Aliens: Dead Orbit (tpb, 104 pages, 2018, ; hc, 120 pages, 2019)
Sobek (w/a, one-shot, ShortBox, 2019)
Grunt: The Art and Unpublished Comics of James Stokoe (w/a, Dark Horse, hc, 184 pages, 2019)
Orphan and the Five Beasts (Dark Horse Comics, 2022)

Covers only

Godzilla: Gangsters and Goliaths #2 (IDW Publishing, 2011)
Cinema Sewer #26 (Robin Bougie, 2013)
Helheim #2 (Oni Press, 2013)
Monstrosity #2 (Kickstarter, 2014)
Rogue Trooper #1-4 (IDW Publishing, 2014)
What if...? — Age of Ultron #2 (Marvel, 2014)
The Transformers vs. G.I. Joe #1 (IDW Publishing, 2014)
Legendary Star-Lord #11 (Marvel, 2015)
Thor vol. 4 #2 (Marvel, 2015)
Cluster #1 (Boom! Studios, 2015)
Zombies vs. Robots #2-4 (IDW Publishing, 2015)
Secret Wars: Battleworld #1-3 (Marvel, 2015)
Secret Wars: Attilan Rising #2 (Marvel, 2015)
Prophet Volume 4 tpb (Image, 2015)
S.H.I.E.L.D. vol. 4 #11 (Marvel, 2015)
Drax #2 (Marvel, 2016)
Judge Dredd vol. 2 #3 (IDW Publishing, 2016)
Godzilla: Oblivion #1-5 (IDW Publishing, 2016)
Head Lopper #3 (Image, 2016)
Birthright #15 (Image, 2016)
Nova vol. 7 #2 (Marvel, 2017)
Venom #150 (Marvel, 2017)
Samurai Jack: Quantum Jack #3 (IDW Publishing, 2017)
Black Hammer: Age of Doom #1 (Dark Horse, 2018)
Under #1-2 (Statix Press, 2018)
2021: Lost Children #1 (Statix Press, 2018)
Eclipse #9 (Top Cow, 2018)
Cayrels Ring #1 (Kickstarter, 2018)
William Gibson's Alien 3 #1 (Dark Horse, 2018)
Robotech #14 (Titan, 2018)
Calamity Kate #2 (Dark Horse, 2019)
Absolute Carnage: Symbiote of Vengeance #1 (Marvel, 2019)

Unfinished projects
Fire for Effect (w/a, a Heavy Metal pitch, 200?)
Nomad of the Domes (w/a, 2007–2008)
War Wonton Soup (w/a, spin-off, 2008–2009)
Murderbullets (w/a, anthology entry turned five-book series, 2008–2009)
Orc Stain:
 "Long Scar's Heat" (w/a, short story for the first trade paperback, 2010)
 Poison Thrower (w/a, Bowie Yaramund-centered one-shot, 2011–2012)
 "The Calling" (w/a, short story, 2014)
Spider-'Nam (w/a, "Spider-Man in Vietnam" fan comic, 2011–2012)
I Will Tell You About Dionysus (w/a, 2013–2014)

References

Sources
Interviews

Living people
Canadian comics artists
1985 births